Caloptilia palaearcha is a moth of the family Gracillariidae. It is known from Fiji.

The larvae feed on Euphorbiaceae species. They probably mine the leaves of their host plant.

References

palaearcha
Moths of Fiji
Moths described in 1930